Kurt Gerstein (11 August 1905 – 25 July 1945) was a German SS officer and head of technical disinfection services of the Hygiene-Institut der Waffen-SS (Institute for Hygiene of the Waffen-SS). After witnessing mass murders in the Belzec and Treblinka Nazi extermination camps, Gerstein gave a detailed report to Swedish diplomat Göran von Otter, as well as to Swiss diplomats, members of the Roman Catholic Church with contacts to Pope Pius XII, and to the Dutch government-in-exile, in an effort to inform the international community about the Holocaust as it was happening. In 1945, following his surrender, he wrote the Gerstein Report covering his experience of the Holocaust. He died of an alleged suicide while in French custody.

Early life
Kurt Gerstein was born in Münster, Westphalia, on 11 August 1905, the sixth of seven children in a Prussian middle-class family that was described as strongly chauvinistic and "totally compliant to authority". His father, Ludwig, a former Prussian officer, was a judge and an authoritarian figure who proudly proclaimed that in his family's genealogical tree there was only Aryan blood and exhorted generations to "preserve the purity of the race!" As late as 1944, he wrote to Kurt: "You are a soldier and an official and you must obey the orders of your superiors. The person who bears the responsibility is the man who gives the orders, not the one who carries them out".

Kurt Gerstein married Elfriede Bensch, a pastor's daughter, on 31 August 1937. They had a daughter, Adelheid.

Education
Kurt was no more tolerant of discipline in secondary school than within the family. However, in spite of earning many bad reports, he managed to graduate at the age of 20. Going directly on to study at the University of Marburg for three semesters, he then transferred to the technical universities in Aachen and Berlin/Charlottenburg where he graduated in 1931 as a mining engineer. While he was at Marburg, he joined, at his father's request, the Teutonia, "one of the most nationalistic student associations in Germany". While he was uncomfortable with the frivolity of the fraternity students, he did not seem to mind their ultranationalism.

In 1936, he moved to Tübingen where he started studying medicine at the University of Tübingen and lived with his wife, Elfriede.

Religious faith
Although his family was not particularly religious, Gerstein received Christian religious training in school. At university, almost as an antidote to what he saw as the frivolous activities of his classmates, he began to read the Bible. From 1925 onwards, he became active in Christian student and youth movements and joined the German Association of Christian Students (DCSV) in 1925. In 1928, he became an active member of both the Evangelical Youth Movement (CVJM-YMCA) and the Federation of German Bible Circles, where he took a leading role until it was dissolved in 1934 after a takeover attempt by the Hitler Youth movement. At first finding a religious home within the Protestant Evangelical Church, he gravitated toward the Confessing Church, which formed itself around Pastor Martin Niemöller in 1934, as a form of protest against attempts by the Nazis to exercise increasing control over German Protestants. His religious faith caused conflict with the Nazis, and he spent time in prison and concentration camps in the late 1930s.

Relations with Nazi Party and government
Like many others of his generation, Gerstein and his family were deeply affected by what they saw as the humiliation of Germany by the terms of the Treaty of Versailles and so were attracted by the extreme nationalism of the Nazi Party. In July 1933, he enrolled in the SA, the original stormtroopers of the Nazi Party. Friedlander describes the contradictions in Gerstein's mind at the time: "Firm defense of religious concepts and of the honour of the Confessional youth movements, but weakness in the face of National Socialism, with acceptance of its terminology and shoddy rhetoric; acceptance, above all, of the existing political order, of its authoritarianism and its hysterical nationalism".

However, in early 1935, he stood up in a theater during a performance of the play Wittekind and vocally protested against its anti-Christian message.  In response, he was attacked and beaten by Nazi Party members in the audience.

On 4 September 1936, Gerstein was arrested for distributing anti-Nazi material, held in protective custody for five weeks and ultimately expelled from the Nazi Party. The loss of membership meant he was unable to find employment as a mining engineer in the state sector. He was arrested a second time in July 1938 but was released six weeks later since no charges were filed against him. With the help of his father and some powerful party and SS officials, he continued to seek reinstatement in the Nazi Party until June 1939, when he obtained a provisional membership.

World War II

Joins SS
In early 1941, Gerstein enlisted in the SS. Explanations are varied and conflicting. One document indicates that it was the result of his outrage over the death of a sister-in-law, who apparently was murdered under the "euthanasia" program Action T4, directed at the mentally ill. Other documents suggest he had already made his decision before she was murdered and that her death reinforced his desire to join the SS to "see things from the inside", try to change the direction of its policies and publicize the crimes that were being committed. Browning describes him as "a covert anti-Nazi who infiltrated the SS", and in a letter to his wife, Gerstein wrote: "I joined the SS... acting as an agent of the Confessing Church."

Because of his technical education, Gerstein quickly rose to become head of technical disinfection services and worked with Odilo Globocnik and Christian Wirth on the technical aspects of mass murder in the extermination camps. He supplied hydrogen cyanide (Zyklon B) to Rudolf Höss in Auschwitz from the Degesch company (Deutsche Gesellschaft für Schädlingsbekämpfung Vermin-Combating Corporation") and conducted the negotiations with the owners. On 17 August 1942, together with Rolf Günther and Wilhelm Pfannenstiel, Gerstein witnessed at Belzec the gassing of some 3,000 Jews who had arrived by train from Lwow. The next day, he went to Treblinka, which had similar facilities, and he observed huge mounds of clothing and underwear, which had been removed from the victims. At the time, motor exhaust gases were used for mass murder in both extermination camps.

Reporting

Several days later, he had a chance encounter on the Warsaw-to-Berlin train with the Swedish diplomat Göran von Otter, who was stationed in Berlin. In a conversation that lasted several hours, he told the diplomat what he had seen and urged him to spread the information internationally. Von Otter talked with high-ranking officials at the Swedish Foreign Ministry, but Gerstein's revelations were never passed on to the Allies or to any other government. In the meantime, Gerstein tried to make contact with representatives of the Vatican, the press attaché at the Swiss legation in Berlin and a number of people linked to the Confessing Church.

One of his contacts was the Dutch citizen J.H. Ubbink, whom he asked to pass on his testimony to the Dutch resistance. A little later, an unnamed member of the Dutch government-in-exile, in London, noted in his diary a testimony that is very similar to Gerstein's report. Gerstein's statements to diplomats and religious officials over from 1942 to 1945 had little effect.

After his surrender in April 1945, Gerstein was ordered to report about his experiences with gassing and the extermination camps in French, followed by two German versions in May 1945.

The historian Christopher Browning noted, "Many aspects of Gerstein's testimony are unquestionably problematic.... [In making] statements, such as the height of the piles of shoes and clothing at Belzec and Treblinka, Gerstein himself is clearly the source of exaggeration. Gerstein also added grossly exaggerated claims about matters to which he was not an eyewitness, such as that a total of 25 million Jews and others were gassed. But in the essential issue, namely that he was in Belzec and witnessed the gassing of a transport of Jews from Lwow, his testimony is fully corroborated.... It is also corroborated by other categories of witnesses from Belzec".

The distinguished French historian Pierre Vidal-Naquet, in Assassins of Memory, discusses such criticism.

Arrest and death
On 22 April 1945, two weeks before Nazi Germany's surrender, Gerstein voluntarily gave himself up to the French commandant of the occupied town of Reutlingen. He received a sympathetic reception and was transferred to a residence in a hotel in Rottweil, where he was able to write his reports. However, he was later transferred to the Cherche-Midi military prison, where he was treated as a Nazi war criminal. On 25 July 1945, he was found dead in his cell in an alleged suicide.

Depictions
A biography by Pierre Joffroy, A Spy for God, was published in English in paperback in 1971.

His search for Christian values and ultimate decision to betray the SS by attempting to expose the Holocaust and informing the Catholic Church is portrayed in the narrative film Amen., released in 2002, starring Ulrich Tukur as Gerstein and directed by Costa-Gavras. Amen. was largely adapted from Rolf Hochhuth's play The Deputy.

William T. Vollmann's Europe Central, the National Book Award fiction winner for 2005, has a 55-page segment, Clean Hands, which relates Gerstein's story.

Thomas Keneally, the author of Schindler's List, wrote a dramatic play, Either Or, on the subject of Gerstein's life as an SS officer and how he dealt with the concentration camps. It premiered at the Theater J in Washington, DC, in May 2007.

In 2010, a group of film students from Emory University produced a short film, "The Gerstein Report", which chronicled the events leading up to Gerstein's death. The film won Best Drama at the 2010 Campus MovieFest International Grande Finale in Las Vegas, Nevada.

The Swedish musician Stefan Andersson wrote the song "Flygblad över Berlin" ("Flyers over Berlin") on his 2018 album with the same name about Gerstein and his meeting with the Swedish diplomat.

See also
Wilhelm Cornides

References

Citations

Sources

Joffroy, Pierre, L'espion de Dieu. La passion de Kurt Gerstein, Robert Laffont, 1969, dernière édition 2002, 453 pages 
Joffroy, Pierre, A Spy For God: The Ordeal of Kurt Gerstein, trans. Norman Denney, Fontana 1972, 256 pages, 
Hey, Bernd u.a.: Kurt Gerstein (1905–1945). Widerstand in SS-Uniform. Bielefeld, Verlag für Regionalgeschichte, 2003. .

A more detailed article appears in the French edition of Wikipedia. It has been closely consulted for this article.

External links
Biography with pictures
The story of Kurt Gerstein
 Biography and picture of Gerstein

1905 births
1945 deaths
People from Münster
People from the Province of Westphalia
Protestants in the German Resistance
SS-Obersturmführer
German military personnel who committed suicide
German people who died in prison custody
Prisoners who died in French detention
Waffen-SS personnel
Nazis who committed suicide in prison custody
1945 suicides
Nazi-era German officials who resisted the Holocaust
Suicides in France